Daphne rhynchocarpa is a shrub, of the family Thymelaeaceae.  It is native to China, specifically Southwest Yunnan.

Description
The shrub is evergreen, and grows up to a height of 3 m. Its branches are gray-brown in color. It is often found in forests at an altitude of around 2500 m.

References

rhynchocarpa